The Rev. John Rosbrugh (c. 1714–1777), also spelled Rosborough and Rosburgh, was a graduate of the College of New Jersey (now Princeton University) where he studied for the ministry and was ordained a Presbyterian minister. In 1776 he organized and became commander of the 3rd Northampton County, Pennsylvania militia, then accepted a commission as company chaplain. He was killed at the Battle of the Assunpink Creek, also known as the Second Battle of Trenton, the first U.S. chaplain killed in battle.

Early life and career

John Rosbrugh was born about 1714 in Enniskillen, County Fermanagh, Northern Ireland, and came to the American colonies with his older brother, William. The family was originally from Ayrshire, Scotland and had come from that country during the settling of the Ulster Plantation.

In 1733, at age 19, Rosbrugh was living in New Jersey and married his wife Sarah, who died in childbirth along with their only child.

Ministry

Somewhat later in life than most he decided to attend the College of New Jersey where he graduated in 1761. He was taken on trials by the New Brunswick Presbytery in 1762, and licensed to preach in August 1763. In October 1764 he was called to the congregations of Greenwich, Oxford, and Mansfield Woodhouse, all in western New Jersey. In December of that same year he was ordained a Presbyterian minister. By 1765, he had been assigned additional duties to neighboring congregations in Upper and Lower Hardwick in the Presbytery of Newton, New Jersey. In 1766, Rev. Rosbrugh married Jane Ralston, daughter of James Ralston of the Irish Settlement also known as Allen Township (now East Allen Township), PA, twenty miles west of where John Rosbrugh was currently serving as pastor. In 1769, Rev. Rosbrugh was called to serve at that same congregation in Allen Township where his wife was from and they moved to the "Irish Settlement" (so named for its Scots-Irish settlers), where he became their permanent minister. For seven years, he ministered to his congregation in Allen Township, raising his young family and at times serving to the needs of nearby congregations.

Revolutionary war

In 1776, with the outbreak of the American Revolutionary War against the British, the pulpit was one of the main forms of communications of the day, Rev. Rosbrugh stirred his congregation to action against the British and the men of the congregation formed a company of militia and agreed to go to war provided Rev. Rosbrugh would lead them. He had expected to accompany them as their chaplain but reluctantly agreed to lead them. John Rosbrugh took his place at the head of the company and slinging his musket over his shoulder led the company to join General Washington and the Continental Army in Philadelphia.

While in Philadelphia, it was determined that Rosbrugh would be better suited to take the position of company Chaplain, which he readily accepted. Captain John Hays took his place as company commander. At that time a chaplain, although not provided a uniform held the rank of major and pay of thirty-three and a half dollars per month.  Presbyterian ministers, however, were particularly hated by the British and if captured suffered the cruelest treatments.

On arriving in Philadelphia, Rosbrugh's company joined the rest of the Northampton County militia in camp. John Rosbrugh was able to dine with his brother-in-law, John Ralston, a member of the Second Continental Congress. The 3rd Battalion was under the command of General Israel Putnam who had orders to cross the Delaware on the 25th of December in support of Washington's surprise attack on Battle of Trenton, but Putnam decided not to cross due to weather conditions so Rosbrugh's battalion remained in Philadelphia. After General Washington crossed back to Pennsylvania with his Hessian prisoners and captured goods, he decided to take Trenton a second time. This time, the 3rd Northampton militia was included and arrived in time for the second battle of Trenton, also known as the battle of Assinpink creek.

Death and burial

The afternoon of January 2 found the American lines, on the south side of Assunpink creek, preparing their positions for the upcoming battle. Rev. John Rosbrugh was dining at a public house when the warning was given that Hessians were coming. Going outside he found his horse had been taken and he was suddenly confronted by a company of Hessians under the command of a British officer. He surrendered but they recognized him as a Presbyterian minister and bayonetted him to death on the spot. His executioners took his watch, money and left his body naked in the snow. Captain Hays, on hearing of the death of his pastor wrapped the body and quickly buried him where he fell. The next morning Rev. George Duffield, a Presbyterian chaplain took the body of his friend and reburied him in the graveyard of the First Presbyterian Church of Trenton. It is believed he still rests there today with his grave marked by a stone shaped as a clock.

Rosbrugh's widow, Jane (née Ralston) survived him by 32 years, passing away on March 27, 1809. She rests in the East Allen Township cemetery in Northampton County, Pennsylvania with the inscription on her tombstone indicating her husband John is buried beside her, raising questions about Rosbrugh's final resting place.

Family

About 1766, Rosbrugh married a second time, to Jane Ralston (1739–1809). She was the daughter of James Ralston of the Irish Settlement or Allen Township, Pennsylvania. John and Jane had five children:
 James Rosbrugh - (b. Apr. 24, 1767) – County Judge, NY State legislator, Captain of militia in the War of 1812, resided at Groveland, New York, where he died November 18, 1850 
 Letitia Rosbrugh - (b. Apr 12, 1769) – Married Samuel Ralston, they remained in Allen Township, Pennsylvania. 
 Mary Rosbrugh  –  Married Robert Ralston, her cousin, a member of the Continental Congress; they had an only daughter Christina. 
 Sarah Rosbrugh –  Never married, removed to Western New York. Died at age seventy-six.
 John Rosbrugh – (b. prob. 1776), he never married and remained a resident of Allen township, PA, up to about 1880; nothing further known of him.

References

Notes

External links
 Rev. John Rosbrugh Marker
 Ten Crucial Days

American military chaplains
American people of Scotch-Irish descent
Clergy in the American Revolution
United States military personnel killed in the American Revolutionary War
Pennsylvania militiamen in the American Revolution
American Presbyterian ministers
Princeton University alumni
1714 births
1777 deaths
People of colonial New Jersey
Deaths by bayonet
People from Enniskillen